Rafique Alam (1929–2011), popularly known as Alam Saheb, was an Indian politician who had been active in politics for six decades. He was a union minister and a member of the Indian National Congress since the beginning of his political career in early 1960s.

Born at Kashibari in Purnea, Bihar on 1 June 1929, Shri Rafique Alam had his education at Russel High School, Kishanganj High School, Purnea, and Aligarh Muslim University. An agriculturist, Shri Rafique Alam was associated with several educational institutions in Purnea district of Bihar. Shri Rafique Alam was the recipient of the National Integration Award, 1988. Shri Alam began his legislative career  as a Member of the Bihar Legislative Assembly from Bahadurganj Vidhan Sabha in 1962 and was a Member of that Assembly from 1962 to 1967, and again representing Kishanganj Vidhan Sabha from 1969–72, 1972–77, 1977 to 1980. He served as Cabinet Minister in the Government of Bihar for several terms, holding portfolios of Transport, Local Self-Government, Irrigation, Housing, Jails, Animal Husbandry, Fishery and Wakf, PWD, Rural Reconstruction and Panchayati Raj. Shri Rafique Alam represented the State of Bihar in this House from April, 1982 to April, 1988 and again from April, 1988 to April, 1994. Shri Alam also served as Pradesh congress President of united Bihar. Shri Rafique Alam also served as Deputy Minister in the Ministry of Petroleum and Natural Gas from February to June, 1988; as Minister of State in the Ministry of Textiles from 1988 to 1989, and as Minister of State (Independent Charge) in the Ministry of Health and Family Welfare from July to November, 1989 in the Union Council of Ministers. He was the Chairman of Committee on Petitions, Rajya Sabha, from 1986 to 1988. Shri Rafique Alam was also the Leader of the Indian Haj Goodwill Delegation in 1988. In the passing away of Shri Rafique Alam, the country has lost an able administrator and a distinguished parliamentarian.

References

1929 births
2011 deaths
Aligarh Muslim University alumni
Indian National Congress politicians
Union ministers of state of India
People from Purnia district
Rajya Sabha members from Bihar
Bihar MLAs 1962–1967
Bihar MLAs 1969–1972
Bihar MLAs 1977–1980
People from Kishanganj district
Indian National Congress politicians from Bihar